The 2010 Cork Senior Football Championship was the 112th staging of the Cork Senior Football Championship since its establishment by the Cork County Board in 1887. The draw for the opening round fixtures took place on 13 December 2009. The championship began on 5 April 2010 and ended on 24 October 2010.

Clonakilty entered the championship as the defending champions, however, they were defeated by Nemo Rangers at the semi-final stage.

On 24 October 2010, Nemo Rangers won the championship following a 2-10 to 1-08 defeat of St. Finbarr's in the final. This was their 18th championship title overall and their first title since 2008.

Duhallow's Donncha O'Connor was the championship's top scorer with 0-30.

Team changes

To Championship

Promoted from the Cork Premier Intermediate Football Championship
 Valley Rovers

From Championship

Relegated to the Cork Premier Intermediate Football Championship
 Mallow

Results

Divisional section

Round 1

Round 2

Round 3

Relegation play-off

Round 4

Quarter-finals

Semi-finals

Final

Championship statistics

Top scorers

Top scorers overall

Top scorers in a single game

Miscellaneous
 Nemo Rangers and St Finbarr's face each-other for the first time in the final.

References

External link

 2010 Cork Senior Football Championship results

Cork Senior Football Championship